The men's 400 metre individual medley event at the 2009 World Aquatics Championships took place on August 2 at the Foro Italico. The heats were held during the morning session and the final were held during the evening session. This swimming event used medley swimming. Because the swimming pool is 50 metres long, this race consisted of eight lengths of the pool. The first two lengths were swum using the butterfly stroke, the second pair with the backstroke, the third pair of lengths in breaststroke, and the final two were freestyle. Unlike other events using freestyle, swimmers could not use butterfly, backstroke, or breaststroke for the freestyle leg; most swimmers use the front crawl in freestyle events.

Records
Prior to this competition, the existing world and competition records were as follows:

Results

Heats

Final

References

External links
2009 World Aquatics Championships – Men's 400 metre individual medley entry list, from OmegaTiming.com; retrieved 2011-05-07.

Individual medley Men 400